Perutherium is monospecific genus of notoungulates from the Late Paleocene to Early Eocene Muñani Formation of Peru. The holotype consists of a fragment of a lower jaw with the posterior half of the first molar and the anterior half of the second molar. A fragment of an upper molar from the same location may also belong to Perutherium.

References 

Notoungulates
Paleocene mammals of South America
Eocene mammals of South America
Casamayoran
Riochican
Itaboraian
Paleogene Peru
Fossils of Peru
Fossil taxa described in 1967
Prehistoric placental genera